The 2020 NCAA Division I Football Championship Game was a postseason college football game that determined a national champion in the NCAA Division I Football Championship Subdivision for the 2019 season. It was played at Toyota Stadium in Frisco, Texas, on January 11, 2020, with kickoff at 12:00 p.m. EST (11:00 a.m. local CST), and television coverage on ABC. It was the culminating game of the 2019 FCS Playoffs.

Teams
The participants of the 2020 NCAA Division I Football Championship Game were the finalists of the 2019 FCS Playoffs—North Dakota State and James Madison—which began with a 24-team bracket. This was a rematch of the 2018 FCS Championship Game, won by North Dakota State, 17–13. Entering the game, North Dakota State and James Madison had won every FCS championship, with North Dakota State winning eight and James Madison winning one, since the 2010 Eastern Washington Eagles won the 2011 FCS Championship Game.

North Dakota State Bison

North Dakota State entered the game with a 15–0 record. They were 12–0 during the regular season, finishing atop the Missouri Valley Football Conference with an 8–0 conference record. The Bison received the top seed for the FCS playoffs, entitling them to a first-round bye. They then defeated Nicholls, Illinois State, and Montana State to reach the championship game. North Dakota entered the title match with a 36-game winning streak, having not lost since falling to South Dakota State on November 4, 2017.

This was North Dakota State's eighth FCS title game; they were 7–0 in prior championship game appearances, having won titles for the 2011, 2012, 2013, 2014, 2015, 2017, and 2018 seasons. During the 2016 playoffs, they were denied a spot in the title game due to a semifinal loss to James Madison.

James Madison Dukes

James Madison entered the game with a 14–1 record. They were 11–1 during the regular season, finishing atop the Colonial Athletic Association with an 8–0 conference record. Their only loss was to FBS program West Virginia, 20–13, on August 31.  The Dukes received the second seed for the FCS playoffs, entitling them to a first-round bye. They then defeated Monmouth, Northern Iowa, and Weber State to reach the championship game.

This was James Madison's fourth FCS title game; they were 2–1 in prior championship game appearances, having won titles for the 2004 and 2016 seasons.

Game summary

Statistics

References

External links
 Game statistics at statbroadcast.com

Championship Game
NCAA Division I Football Championship Games
James Madison Dukes football games
North Dakota State Bison football games
American football in the Dallas–Fort Worth metroplex
Sports in Frisco, Texas
NCAA Division I Football Championship Game
NCAA Division I Football Championship Game